Paul Donaldson King (July 14, 1926 – July 10, 1996) was an American producer and screenwriter. He was nominated for an Academy Award in the category Best Original Screenplay for the film Operation Petticoat. King died in July 1996 of cancer at his home in Newport Beach, California, at the age of 69. He was interred at Pacific View Memorial Park in Corona del Mar, Newport Beach.

Selected filmography 
 Operation Petticoat (1959; co-nominated with Stanley Shapiro, Maurice Richlin and Joseph Stone)

References

External links 

1926 births
1996 deaths
20th-century American male writers
20th-century American screenwriters
American male screenwriters
American male television writers
American television producers
American television writers
Burials at Pacific View Memorial Park
Deaths from cancer in California
Loyola Marymount University alumni
Screenwriters from California
Television producers from California
University of Southern California alumni
Writers from Los Angeles